Rocca Pendice is a mountain of the Veneto, Italy. It has an elevation of 304 metres.

Mountains of Veneto